The Brazil women's national under-16 and under-17 basketball team is a national basketball team of Brazil, governed by the Confederaçao Brasileira de Basketball.
It represents the country in international under-16 and under-17 (under age 16 and under age 17) women's basketball competitions.

Competitive record

Under-17 World Cup
As the only South American team, Brazil qualified for the 2016 FIBA Under-17 World Championship for Women where it finished 13th.

Americas Under-16 Championship
At the Americas Championship, Brazil has traditionally battled Argentina as South America's frontrunner. In this duel, Brazil has kept the upper hand as they have won two silver medals. At the 2015 event, Brazil eliminated the traditionally dominant United States but ceded to Canada in the finals 71-72 after overtime.

In 2021, Ana Passos Alves Da Silva and Taissa Nascimento Queiroz both averaged a double-double through group play for Brazil, but Giovanna Rocha da Silva has followed the lead with a 10 point and 8 rebound average of her own.

South American U17 Championship
At the 2015 event in Paraguay, Brazil won the title as the finished with a 5-0 record.

See also
Brazil women's national basketball team
Brazil women's national under-19 basketball team
Brazil men's national under-17 basketball team
Brazil men's national basketball team

References

External links
Archived records of Ireland team participations

Basketball teams in Brazil
Women's national under-17 basketball teams
Basketball